Nyandarua High School is a government National mixed School in Ol Kalou, Nyandarua County Kenya, with about 800 students and four streams. It was established in 1965 and officially opened as a mixed school in 1967.
It is among the top county schools and top 100 in the Country.

External links

                

Education in Kenya